Liquore Galliano L'Autentico, known more commonly as Galliano, is a brand of sweet herbal liqueur produced in Italy. It was created in 1896 by Tuscan distiller and brandy producer Arturo Vaccari and named after Giuseppe Galliano, an Italian officer of the Royal Italian Army of the First Italo-Ethiopian War.

Galliano is sweet with vanilla-anise flavour and subtle citrus and woodsy herbal undernotes.  The vanilla top note differentiates Galliano from other anise-flavoured liqueurs such as anisette, ouzo, sambuca, and pastis.

Galliano is used both as a digestif and as an ingredient for cocktails, notably the Harvey Wallbanger, Yellow Bird, Golden Cadillac, and Golden Dream.

Ingredients
Galliano has numerous natural ingredients including star anise, Mediterranean anise, juniper berry, musk yarrow, lavender, peppermint, cinnamon, and Galliano's hallmark vanilla flavour. Galliano uses vanillin for flavouring and sugar and glucose syrup for sweetening. Caramel and tartrazine are used to achieve Galliano's bright yellow colour.

Neutral alcohol is infused with the pressings from the herbs except for the vanilla. The liquid is distilled and then infused with separately pressed vanilla. In the final stage, distilled water, refined sugar and pure neutral alcohol are blended with the base. The original blend is formulated at 84.6 proof (42.3% by volume), while a blend with a more prominent taste of vanilla is produced at 60 proof (30% by volume). There was also a period where 80 proof (40% alcohol by volume) was produced.

Brand ownership
The Galliano brand is currently owned by Dutch distiller Lucas Bols, and marketed through its worldwide distribution joint venture, Maxxium. Galliano is packaged in a distinctively shaped bottle, reminiscent of a classical Roman column. 

Several other liqueurs are also produced under the Galliano brand name, including a black Sambuca, a white Sambuca and an amaretto, which are predominantly distributed in Australasia, where the products are popular as shots.
Galliano also makes Galliano Ristretto coffee-flavored liqueur and Galliano Balsamico, a balsamic vinegar-infused liqueur.

Awards
Galliano has earned bronze and silver medals from the San Francisco World Spirits Competition.  Another spirit ratings organization, Wine Enthusiast Magazine, gave Galliano L'autentico a score of "90–95" in 2011.

Notes

External links
 

Products introduced in 1896
Anise liqueurs and spirits
Herbal liqueurs
Italian liqueurs
Italian companies established in 1896
Vanilla liqueurs